Hollfeld is a town in the district of Bayreuth, in Bavaria, Germany.

It is situated 20 km west of Bayreuth, and 30 km east of Bamberg.

Sport
The towns association football club, ASV Hollfeld, experienced its greatest success in 2012 when it qualified for the new northern division of the expanded Bayernliga, the fifth tier of the German football league system, where it played for two seasons until 2014.

Gallery

Villages

References

External links

 Website (German)

Bayreuth (district)